Dick Grayson, better known by his superhero alias Robin, is a fictional character from Joel Schumacher's superhero films Batman Forever (1995) and Batman & Robin, portrayed by Chris O'Donnell, based on the DC Comics character Robin, created by Bob Kane, Bill Finger, and Jerry Robinson.

In the film series, Richard "Dick" Grayson is in his mid-to-late teens and is the younger of two brothers. The "Flying Graysons" act are depicted as a family quartet (instead of a trio). Grayson's parents and older brother are killed by Two-Face instead of Tony Zucco like in the comics.

Character arc

Batman Forever
Dick Grayson's parents and older brother were murdered by Two-Face (Tommy Lee Jones) during a hostage situation at the annual Gotham Circus after the family helps get rid of a bomb rigged to explode. Bruce Wayne (Val Kilmer) takes him in as his ward out of guilt for being unable to save Dick's family. Dick however, is obsessed with killing Two-Face to avenge his family. 

Suspicious of Bruce's and Alfred Pennyworth's (Michael Gough) behavior around a certain door they keep locked, Dick ends up finding his way into the Batcave after discovering an entrance to the concealed behind a silverware storage cupboard. Later in the film, Dick takes the Batmobile for a joy ride. Having discovered Bruce's identity as Batman, Dick insists on becoming a crime-fighter himself, taking on the name "Robin", an old nickname courtesy of his late father and older brother, and helping Batman defeat Two-Face and the Riddler (Jim Carrey). Before taking on the name Robin, Dick considers "Nightwing" as a possible codename. Batman, however, refuses to make Dick his partner, fearing that the young man will get himself killed.

Two-Face and the Riddler invade Wayne Manor, having discovered Batman's secret identity, and kidnap Chase Meridian (Nicole Kidman), Bruce Wayne's love interest. Bruce and Dick put aside their differences and go to rescue Chase as Batman and Robin. 

Robin fights with Two-Face and has him at his mercy, but ultimately decides to spare his life - only for the disfigured gangster to take him prisoner. The Riddler sets a trap in which Batman has to choose between saving Robin or Chase, but Batman manages to foil the trap and save them both. After subduing the Riddler, Batman and Robin defeat Two-Face by throwing a box full of coins at the villain's trademark two-headed coin in mid-flip, causing him to fall to his death as he grabs at it.

After saving Chase, Batman and Robin officially become crime-fighting partners.

Batman & Robin
Tension between Batman (George Clooney) and Robin is present in the film due to Robin growing tired of playing second fiddle to Batman and desiring to get out of Batman's shadow, particularly after Robin's recklessness leads to him getting frozen by Mr. Freeze (Arnold Schwarzenegger). These feelings are later amplified when Poison Ivy (Uma Thurman) exposes Robin to her mind-altering pheromone dust and causes him to fall in love with her, sowing seeds of doubt regarding Batman's faith in his ward. Ivy even alters the Bat-Signal by changing it to a "Robin-Signal" to lure Robin into a trap. In the film's climax, Robin eventually sees through Ivy's schemes and makes amends with Batman, and throughout the film, it is hinted that he harbors romantic feelings towards Alfred's niece, Barbara Wilson (Alicia Silverstone), who later becomes Batgirl.

Development
Robin did not appear in the Tim Burton movies Batman (1989) and Batman Returns (1992). This was an unusual move as the two 1940s serials as well as the 1966 movie and attendant TV show had presented the 'Dynamic Duo' as an inseparable pair, with the general public unaware that the comic-book incarnation of Batman often worked alone. The special edition version of the Batman (1989) DVD features an animated storyboard sequence of when Robin's parents are killed by the Joker. Jason Hillhouse provides the voice of Dick Grayson, while Kevin Conroy and Mark Hamill reprise their respective roles (from the DC animated universe) as Batman and the Joker in the storyboard sequence. Burton planned to cast Northern Irish actor Ricky Addison Reed as Robin, but later felt it was unimportant to the story and cut Robin out altogether. 

In an earlier script of Batman Returns, he was portrayed as a technologically savvy street kid who would help Batman following his narrow escape when The Penguin tried to kill him. He would later play a crucial role in Batman's final confrontation with The Penguin. In that script, he was simply called Robin, has no known real name, and was to be played by Marlon Wayans. Wayans was considered for the role of Robin in Batman Forever, but the change in directors from Burton to Joel Schumacher would also mean a change in the choice of actor for the role of Robin. 

Leonardo DiCaprio was considered, but decided not to pursue the role after a meeting with Schumacher. Matt Damon, Corey Haim, Corey Feldman, Mark Wahlberg, Michael Worth, Toby Stephens, Ewan McGregor, Jude Law, Alan Cumming, Ben Affleck, Kiefer Sutherland And,Christian Bale (who starred as Batman/Bruce Wayne in The Dark Knight trilogy), and Scott Speedman were considered also. 

Chris O'Donnell was cast and Mitch Gaylord served as his stunt double, and also portrayed Mitch Grayson, Dick's older brother, created for the film. Allegedly at a comic book convention, they asked a group of 11-year-old boys, the target audience, which could win a fistfight. After the boys overwhelmingly declared O'Donnell the winner against Leonardo DiCaprio, he was ultimately given the role. Michael Worth was also one of the front-runners for the role of Robin. Worth ended up having a cameo alongside O'Donnell in one of the film's fight scenes (throwing the final kick at Robin in the alleyway). 

Chris O'Donnell revealed to Access Hollywood that a Robin spin-off was planned but got scrapped after Batman & Robin. He was the producers' original choice for the role of James Darrell Edwards III/Agent J in Men in Black (1997), but, after turning it down because he thought the character would be too similar to his role in Batman Forever, the role went to Will Smith.

During the filming of Batman & Robin, Warner Bros. was impressed with the dailies, prompting them to immediately hire Joel Schumacher to return as director for a fifth film.  George Clooney, Chris O'Donnell, Alicia Silverstone, and Coolio were set to reprise the roles of Batman, Robin, Batgirl, and Scarecrow. It was hoped that the villains from previous films would make cameo appearances in the hallucinations caused by Scarecrow, culminating with Jack Nicholson reprising the role of the Joker. Following the poor critical and financial reception of Batman & Robin, Clooney vowed never to reprise his role.

Costume
Slate noted that Robin wore a codpiece and "Bat-nipples" and said that what "Joel Schumacher produced wasn’t gay subtext; it was gay domtext." Schumacher stated, "I had no idea that putting nipples on the Batsuit and Robin suit were going to spark international headlines. The bodies of the suits come from ancient Greek statues, which display perfect bodies. They are anatomically correct."

Chris O'Donnell felt "it wasn't so much the nipples that bothered me. It was the codpiece. The press obviously played it up and made it a big deal, especially with Joel directing. I didn't think twice about the controversy, but going back and looking and seeing some of the pictures, it was very unusual."

In the character's second appearance within the film series, Batman & Robin, Dick Grayson pursues being a vigilante on his own and wears the Nightwing costume design. His costume though, is a blue rubber suit with a red bird symbol on the chest. He also wears a silvery Arctic version of his Robin costume. O'Donnell complained of the Robin costume, saying it was more involved and uncomfortable than the one he wore in Batman Forever, with a glued-on mask which caused sweat to pool on his face.

Redbird
As with the Batmobile, Robin's motorcycle, the Redbird as seen in Batman & Robin was a ground-up build, utilizing fiberglass and carbon fiber. The company TFX developed the Redbird on a Honda off-road motorcycle.

The Redbird has two drive nozzles, which allows the vehicle to rise. This is dependent on the speed when taking off, making the Redbird airborne for 20 seconds or longer. There's a central computer on the tank that supplies an LCD announcement containing additional information for the driver. Additionally, the Redbird has small burls to the tire, which can be driven out very fast, in order to increase the road grip. Also, it features a grappling hook, which is attached in the front fender over the tire. 

In the film, Batman has an override program capable of controlling the Redbird from the Batmobile. He uses it in order to shut the Redbird down when Robin tries to make a life-threatening jump between buildings.

Cancelled projects
Before the box office failure of Batman & Robin, O'Donnell's Robin was set to reappear in the fifth Batman film, tentatively titled Batman Unchained. The film was set to explore further the rift forming between Batman and Robin, abandoning Bruce toward the beginning of the film. Robin would have returned, however, in the final fight. Chris O'Donnell was set to return.  The film was abandoned in favour of a full reboot of the Batman film series. 

O'Donnell also reported that he was in talks to reprise the role of Dick Grayson in a spin-off.

Reception
The 1995 feature film Batman Forever, and especially its 1997 sequel Batman & Robin, both helmed by the openly gay director Joel Schumacher, have been interpreted as having homoerotic overtones. Slate magazine called Schumacher's Batman films "defiantly queer", with a "sugar daddy" Batman and "rough-trade" Robin. 

A line spoken by Robin in Batman Forever is an homage to the television Robin's catch-phrase exclamations that started "Holy" and sometimes ended "Batman!" - for instance "Holy bargain basements, Batman!" (from the television series' first season) and "Holy flypaper, Batman!" (from the television series' second season). During the film, Robin says "Holey rusted metal, Batman!" after the duo climbs onto twisted metal girders beside some water. This catchphrase also appeared for a time in Batman comic books. According to film critics Deborah Cartmell and Imelda Whelehan, Robin's quip was an "explicit in-joke". 

Batman & Robin was nominated for 11 Golden Raspberry Awards, including "Worst Screen Couple" George Clooney and Chris O'Donnell and "Worst Supporting Actor" both Chris O'Donnell and Arnold Schwarzenegger.

When comparing work on Batman Forever, Chris O'Donnell explained, "It just felt like everything got a little soft the second time. On Batman Forever, I felt like I was making a movie. The second time, I felt like I was making a kid's toy commercial." O'Donnell also said that despite hanging out with Arnold Schwarzenegger (Mr. Freeze) a lot off set and during promotion for Batman & Robin, they never worked a single day together; this was achieved with stand-ins when one of the actors was not available.

Legacy
Robin appeared as a playable character in the Batman Forever video game, Batman Forever: The Arcade Game, and in the Batman & Robin video game.

Six Flags Great Adventure theme park re-themed their "Axis Chemical" arena, home of the Batman stunt show, to resemble "Batman Forever", and the new show featured props from the film. Six Flags Over Texas featured a one-time fireworks show to promote the movie, and replica busts of Batman, Robin, Two-Face, and the Riddler can still be found in the Justice League store in the Looney Tunes U.S.A. section.

References

External links

 
 DCEU's Flashpoint Should Revive Schumacher's Nightwing Spin-Off Idea
 Chris O'Donnell was going to play Nightwing
 Chris O’Donnell: Why Batman And Robin May Have Been His Best Year
 Batman Forever Was the Perfect Robin Origin Movie
 How Batman Forever Got Robin Right
 Boys of Wonder – Ranking the On-Screen Robins
 Ric Grayson Is Pretty Much Dick Grayson From 'Batman Forever'
 Why ‘Batman Forever’ Is As Definitive A Batman Movie As ‘The Dark Knight’
 ‘Batman Forever’ Dared to Make the Dark Knight Campy Again
 Somehow, 25 years later, ‘Batman Forever’ still works. You just have to know where to look.
 Batman Forever: The novelization vs. the movie
 COMICSALLIANCE REVIEWS ‘BATMAN FOREVER’ (1995), PART ONE
 Holy Bat-feuds! Revisiting the behind-the-scenes drama surrounding 'Batman Forever' 25 years later
 Why Does 'Batman Forever' Make Some Men So Uncomfortable?
 The Most Ridiculous Moments From 'Batman Forever'
 Marlon Wayans Explains What Happened to His Robin in 'Batman Forever'
 ‘Batman & Robin’ Star Chris O’Donnell Reveals If Robin Was Gay (Video)
 'Batman Forever' 20 Years Later: Chris O'Donnell Looks Back on the Franchise
 Why Hollywood won't cast Chris O'Donnell anymore
 Chris O'Donnell On Batman: It Was All About The Codpiece
 Chris O’Donnell Still Has His Robin Costume From ‘Batman And Robin’
 Former Robin Chris O'Donnell Reveals His Favorite Batman

Action film characters
Batman (1989 film series)
Batman live-action film characters
DC Comics male superheroes
DC Comics martial artists
DC Comics orphans
Fictional acrobats
Fictional gymnasts
Fictional vigilantes
Film characters introduced in 1995
Orphan characters in film
Dick Grayson
Robin (character)
Robin (character) in other media
Superheroes with alter egos
Male characters in film 
Batman characters